Marcos Paulo is a masculine Portuguese given name. Notable people with the name include:

Marcos Paulo Alves (born 1977), Brazilian footballer
Marcos Paulo Gelmini Gomes (born 1988), Brazilian footballer
Marcos Paulo Souza Ribeiro, known as Marcos, (born 1974), Brazilian footballer
Marcos Paulo Aguiar de Jesus, known as Pepe, (born 1983), Brazilian footballer
Marcos Paulo Segobe da Silva, known as Careca, (born 1980), Brazilian footballer
Marcos Paulo Simões (1951–2012), Brazilian actor
Marcos Paulo (footballer, born 2001), Portuguese-Brazilian footballer
Marcos Paulo (footballer, born 2003), Marcos Paulo Lima Batista Silva, Brazilian football left-back

See also
Marcos (disambiguation)
Paulo
Marco Paulo
Paulo Marcos de Jesus Ribeiro, (born 1986), Brazilian footballer

Portuguese masculine given names